David Smith (born September 25, 1963) is a Canadian politician.

A former member of the House of Commons of Canada, Smith served as a city councillor in Maniwaki, Quebec until 2004. At this point, he ran in the 2004 Canadian federal election for the Liberal Party of Canada in the riding of Pontiac where he won. He is a former business manager and public servant.

In the 2006 election. he was not able to hold on to his seat, losing to Conservative star candidate Lawrence Cannon. Smith earned 24.2% of the popular vote, finishing third behind Cannon (33.7%) and the Bloc Québécois' Christine Émond Lapointe (28.7%).

References

External links
 
 CBC Radio One investigation of David Smith (courtesy of Angry in the Great White North)
 Report on David Smith by the Ethics Commissioner

1963 births
Living people
Members of the House of Commons of Canada from Quebec
Liberal Party of Canada MPs
Métis politicians
Canadian Métis people
Indigenous Members of the House of Commons of Canada
21st-century Canadian politicians
People from Maniwaki